The FRG9 insurgency in Haiti is an ongoing civil conflict between the Revolutionary Forces of the G9 Family and Allies (FRG9 or G9), the G-Pep and the Government of Haiti for the control of Port-au-Prince.

The conflict

Background
Since the end of the MINUSTAH (a UN peacekeeping operation in Haiti started after the end of the 2004 coup d'état) on October 15, 2017, there was an increase of the gang-related violence, also against civilians, like the 2018 Port-au-Prince massacre that killed 25 civilians.

Pre-FRG9 coalition
In May 2020, a coalition of eleven gangs (Delmas 19 gang, Delmas 6 gang, Delmas 95 gang, Nan Barozi gang, Nan Belekou gang, Nan Boston gang, Nan Chabón gang, Nan Ti Bwa gang, Pilate Base gang, Simon Pele gang, Wharf de Jeremie gang) was founded to attack several neighborhoods in Port-au-Prince as a way to secure and expand territorial control, in the same month they attacked civilians in the hoods of Port-au Prince, killing 34 people, at the end of the month the coalition was dissolved.

Fondation of FRG9 and start of the massacres
After those attacks, another coalition of nine gangs, on a video on Youtube, was announced to be founded in Port-au Prince under the name Fòs Revolisyonè G9 an Fanmi e Alye (Revolutionary Forces of the G9 Family and allies) to work towards the development of the most underprivileged neighborhoods of Haiti. The coalition is lead by Jimmy Chérizier, called Barbecue, an ex-police officer. Since the coalition was founded, it was responsible of lot of massacres against civilians and clashes with other rival gangs. From 2020 to 2021, the FRG9 was responsible of a dozen of massacres, in wich there were killed at least 200 peoples. The FRG9 was believed to have close ties to the government of President Jovenel Moïse, accused of large-scale corruption, because the coalition members evaded persecution after the massacres and the clashes, Chérizier stood out in this regard because despite the arrest warrants against him, he continued to move freely and have an active presence on social media without any attempts by forces of the Government of Haiti to effectively arrest him and the G9 started to attack the hoods in which the civilians started to do protests against the president and started also clashes against rival gangs with the support of the police. After the assassination of Jovenel Moïse, on July 7, 2021, the G9 started to help the government in the manhunt against the 28 foreign perpetrators. After the killing of the president, Ariel Henry, believed to be linked in the killing of Moïse, became the president of Haiti, after that the violence increased. In January 2021, another gang, called G-Pep, led by Gabriel Jean-Pierre, was founded in Port-au Prince and started to fight against FRG9 for the control of the hoods. On May 12, 2021, during a clash with G-Pep, Chérizier was reported to be wounded. From July 8 to 9, 2022, the violence between the two gangs increased after the start of a battle in the hoods of Port-au Prince, that killed 89 people and injured 74.
The battle caused the nearby Varreux field terminal to pause operations, leading to a more drastic shortage in fuel as two fuel tankers were unable to be unloaded and Doctors Without Borders has stated that the organization has been unable to access the slum due to the violence. After the battle and the increase of the price of the fuel for the socioeconomic crisis, on September 12, the FRG9 started clashes against the government and blockaded the Varreux fuel terminal, the country's largest fuel depot, as a response the government, with the help of the United States and of the Mexico, send foreign troops and armored vehicles against the gang on October 15. On November 6, 2022, after two weeks of negotiations with the Haitian government and after an armed offensive launched by the Haitian National Police, the G9 gang coalition relinquished control of the Varreux fuel terminal.

References

See also
MINUSTAH
2022 Port-au-Prince gang battles
2004 Haitian coup d'état
Jamaican political conflict

2018–2023 Haitian crisis
History of Port-au-Prince
Gang battles
Organized crime conflicts